The Rio Puerco de Chama is a tributary of the Rio Chama in the U.S. state of New Mexico. It flows northeast from the Nacimiento Mountains to join the Chama above Abiquiu Lake.

See also
List of rivers of New Mexico

References

Rivers of Rio Arriba County, New Mexico
Rivers of New Mexico
Old Spanish Trail (trade route)